Thomas Conrad Hoefling (born December 20, 1960) is an American activist and politician, who was the founder and national chairman of America's Party. Hoefling was the party's 2012 and 2016 presidential nominee, after seeking the nomination of the Constitution and American Independent parties. Currently a member of the Republican Party, Hoefling has served as political director for Alan Keyes' political group America's Revival and as a representative for the American Conservative Coalition.

Career

Presidential campaigns (2012, 2016) 

In August 2012, the ballot-qualified American Independent Party nominated Hoefling for President.

Hoefling was on the ballot in California, Colorado, and Florida. He was also filed as a qualified write-in candidate in Alaska, Connecticut, Delaware, Illinois, Indiana, Kentucky, Michigan, Montana, Ohio, Texas, and West Virginia. Hoefling received 40,624 votes in the general election, or 0.03%, coming in 8th place nationally out of 27 candidates who were on the ballot in at least one state.

Iowa gubernatorial campaign (2013) 
In December 2013, Hoefling announced his bid for the Republican nomination for Governor of Iowa in the 2014 election. He lost the nomination to incumbent Republican Governor Terry Branstad.

Personal life 
Hoefling is married to Siena Stone Hoefling. They have ten children; Matthew, Katherine, Timothy, Elijah, Sebastian, Samuel, Grace, Caleb, Jacob, and Ezra.

References

External links 

|-

|-

1960 births
21st-century American politicians
America's Party (political party) politicians
American political activists
Iowa Republicans
Living people
Candidates in the 2012 United States presidential election
Candidates in the 2016 United States presidential election
Activists from Iowa
Candidates in the 2020 United States presidential election